The 2018 Indy Eleven season was the club's fifth season of existence, and their first season in the United Soccer League following their move from the North American Soccer League on January 10. Indy also competed in the U.S. Open Cup. The season covered the period from October 30, 2017 to the beginning of the 2019 USL season.

2018 marked a number of firsts for the club: the first year that home matches were played in Lucas Oil Stadium, located in downtown Indianapolis, as well as the first year of Martin Rennie's managerial tenure. Although Rennie was victorious in his first game in charge of the club, Indy were defeated in their first-ever match at their new home stadium. The season average of 10,163 fans per home match was the second-largest average attendance in Indy Eleven history, behind only the club's inaugural season.

The Eleven qualified for the USL playoffs in their first season in the league, finishing with 49 points and earning the 7th seed in the Eastern Conference. However, they were eliminated in the conference quarterfinals by Louisville City, who went on to win USL Cup for the second consecutive season. In the U.S. Open Cup, Indy was eliminated in the second round by fourth-tier Mississippi Brilla, marking the second consecutive season that the club was knocked out by a Premier Development League opponent.

Roster

Staff
  Martin Rennie – Head Coach
  Phillip Dos Santos – Assistant Coach
  David Dixon – Assistant Coach
  Andy Swift – Goalkeeper Coach

Preseason
Indy Eleven played a seven-match preseason schedule ahead of the season, featuring four matches against fellow professional clubs, two games against collegiate teams, and one game against an independent club. Although five of the seven matches were officially home matches for Indy, none of them were played at Lucas Oil Stadium; instead, they were played at different sites around the Indianapolis metropolitan area.

Competitions

USL

Standings

Results summary

Results by round

Match results
In August 2017, the USL announced that the 2018 season would span 34 games, the longest regular season the league had ever run. The expansion was spurred by the addition of six new clubs for the 2018 season: alongside Indy, the league also welcomed in Atlanta United 2, Fresno FC, Las Vegas Lights, Nashville SC, and North Carolina FC.

On January 12, 2018, the league announced home openers for every club. Indy began the season on the road, facing off against Richmond Kickers on March 24. The Eleven opened their home slate a week later, welcoming FC Cincinnati to Lucas Oil Stadium for the first match at the stadium in club history.

The schedule for the remainder of the 2018 season was released by the club on February 6. Indy played three times against four different clubs: FC Cincinnati, Louisville City, Pittsburgh Riverhounds SC, and Bethlehem Steel FC. They faced every other Eastern Conference team twice.

Postseason

U.S. Open Cup

Statistics

Appearances and goals

|}

Disciplinary record

Clean sheets

Transfers

In

Loan in

Out

Loan out

Awards

USL Team of the Week

USL Player of the Week

USL Save of the Week

Midseason
USL Midseason Moments
 Best SC Top 10 – Soony Saad vs. Nashville SC, April 14
 Best Ending – vs. Charleston Battery, May 30
 Best Tifo – Brickyard Battalion, Stranger Things, March 31

Postseason
USL All-League Second Team
 DF Ayoze

Kits

See also
 Indy Eleven
 2018 in American soccer
 2018 USL season

References

Indy Eleven seasons
Indy Eleven
Indy Eleven
Indy Eleven